KVFD (1400 AM) is a radio station that broadcasts from Fort Dodge, Iowa. It airs a talk format. Local news and talk hosted by Mike Devine (local big-mouth).

History
On March 15, 2009, KVFD changed its format from oldies to talk.

KVFD is not to be confused with KFVD, a Los Angeles area station using a similar call sign from 1925 to 1955.

Previous logo
 (KVFD's logo under its previous oldies format)

References

External links

VFD
News and talk radio stations in the United States
Fort Dodge, Iowa
Radio stations established in 1939
1939 establishments in Iowa